Johnathan Lee Iverson (born January 30, 1976) is an American ringmaster best known for his association with the Ringling Brothers and Barnum and Bailey Circus, where he was the first African-American ringmaster of a major U.S. circus.

Early life and education
Iverson grew up in the Central Park West neighborhood of New York City. He began his career with the Boys Choir of Harlem. He attended the Fiorello H. LaGuardia High School of Music and Art & Performing Arts.

Iverson graduated from The Hartt School of the University of Hartford, where he was training to become an opera singer.

Career

Ringmaster 
In 1998, at 22 years old, Iverson became the youngest, the first New Yorker, and the first African American Ringmaster in the nearly 140 year history of Ringling Bros. and Barnum & Bailey. Iverson’s presence at The Greatest Show On Earth set box office records for Ringling Bros. and Barnum & Bailey throughout the United States. Audiences and critics alike were immediately smitten by the native New Yorker. Ebony magazine said of him: "The instant he appears out of the darkness and into the spotlight…the audience is rapt." The San Francisco Examiner stated:  "Now imagine mesmerizing the crowd with a powerful voice and the bearing of a superstar." The Times-Picayune wrote: "Tall and self assured…he works a crowd like a three ring evangelist." And syndicated columnist Liz Smith gushed: "I…liked six foot [five] youngest ringmaster ever, Johnathan Lee Iverson, who is commanding enough to be noticed in the melee, and he can sing."

Among the myriad of accolades and praise received by Iverson, was being recognized as one of Barbara Walters’ 10 Most Fascinating People of 1999. Iverson’s historical tenure with The Greatest Show On Earth is featured in numerous publications, including, Black First: 4, 000 Ground-Breaking and Pioneering Historical Events by Jessie Carney Smith, African-American First by Joan Potter, Live Life! Be Young, Black, and Successful by Quincy Benton, and Beat of a Different Drum: The Untold Stories of African-Americans Forging Their Own Paths in Work and Life by Dax-Devlon Ross. 

Iverson joined the 129th Edition of Ringling Bros. and Barnum & Bailey Presents The Living Carousel in 1998 and performed until Ringling Bros. and Barnum & Bailey closed in 2017, making him The Last Ringmaster. 

After the circus' closure, Iverson worked as Ringmaster at Circus Vargas and the Chairman of the Board for Omnium: A Bold New Circus, as well as, a founding member of the American Circus Alliance. In 2021 he acted as ringmaster for Omnium Circus' world debut.

Theater 
In 2022 Iverson starred in a production of Trav’lin: A 1930s Harlem Musical Romance in Winter Park, Florida.

Personal life 
While working with Barnum and Bailey Circus, Iverson married a fellow performer, Priscilla, and the pair had two children, Matthew and Lila, who also were performing with Ringling by its final performance.

References

External links 
bigtopvoice.com

Entertainers from New York City
Ringmasters
1976 births
Living people
University of Hartford Hartt School alumni